Trivial Pursuit is a game show loosely based on the board game of the same name. The show first aired on BBC1 from 4 September to 18 December 1990 hosted by Rory McGrath. It was revived on The Family Channel from 6 September 1993 to 1994 hosted by Tony Slattery.

Transmissions

BBC1

The Family Channel

References

External links
 

1990 British television series debuts
1994 British television series endings
BBC television game shows
1990s British game shows
English-language television shows
Television shows based on board games
Television series by Endemol
Television shows based on Hasbro toys
British television series revived after cancellation